Volgograd, Russia, held a mayoral election on May 20, 2007. Roman Grebennikov of the Communist Party of the Russian Federation won the election.

Candidates 
 Roman Grebennikov, KPRF
 Roland Kherianov,
 Vasili Galushkin, United Russia
 Dmitri Krylov, independent

Results

References 
 Interfax

Elections in Volgograd
2007 elections in Russia
Mayoral elections in Russia
May 2007 events in Russia